Richard Mark Burton (born 16 January 1956) is a New Zealand politician. He is a member of the Labour Party, serving as Minister of Defence, Minister of Justice, Minister of Local Government, Minister in Charge of Treaty of Waitangi Negotiations, Deputy Leader of the House, and the Minister Responsible for the Law Commission in the Fifth Labour Government of New Zealand.

Early life
Burton was born in Northampton, England, but was brought to New Zealand by his family when ten years old. He attended high school in Wanganui, attending Wanganui Boys College and was in the year group ahead of future National MP Michael Laws. He has been involved in a wide range of social and community organisations, including the Red Cross, the Department of Social Welfare, the Central Plateau Rural Education Activities Programme, the Council of Social Services, the Taupo Employment Support Trust, and the Taupo Sexual Abuse Counselling Service. He received the New Zealand 1990 Commemoration Medal for his work.

Member of Parliament

In the 1993 election, Burton stood as the Labour Party's candidate for Tongariro, an electorate in the central North Island, defeating Ian Peters. This later became the seat of Taupo, which Burton retained.

From 1996 to 1999, he served as his party's Senior Whip.

Cabinet minister
When the Labour Party won power in the 1999 election, Burton became part of the new Cabinet, assuming the roles of Minister of Internal Affairs, Minister of Defence, Minister for State-Owned Enterprises, Minister of Tourism, and Minister of Veterans' Affairs. In 2002, Internal Affairs and Veterans' Affairs were transferred to George Hawkins. In February 2005 he became the Minister of Treaty of Waitangi Negotiations, and dropped the State-Owned Enterprises portfolio.

In late 2004, with Jonathan Hunt set to retire from politics, Burton was regarded by many as the Labour Party's preferred choice to replace him as Speaker of the House of Representatives. In the end, however, Labour decided to nominate Margaret Wilson for the position.

Burton sponsored the introduction of the Electoral Finance Act, which made election funding more transparent and open by making anonymous donations illegal if they exceed the sum of $12,000. The Act capped the highest donation to the sum of $120,000 and increased public funding in elections to allow for more funding to go to a wider range of parties. The Act extended the regulated period classifying an election year to 1 January of the election year.

In November 2007 Burton resigned from his Cabinet positions during Prime Minister Helen Clark's portfolio renewal. When Labour's party list was written prior to the 2008 general election, he was given a low placing of 39. He then lost his seat in a nationwide swing to the National Party, and due to his place on the list, was not returned to parliament.

Burton stood unsuccessfully for Taupo District Mayor in the 2010 local body elections. After Darren Hughes resigned his list seat in 2011, and the next person on the Labour Party list, Judith Tizard, declined to take it up, Burton was entitled to reenter Parliament for the remainder of the term. However, he also declined the offer.

Further reading

Burton's contribution is a paper entitled: " New Zealand defence: playing our part as a responsible world citizen."

Burton's contribution is a paper entitled: "Impact on government: a political perspective."

References

1956 births
English emigrants to New Zealand
Living people
Members of the Cabinet of New Zealand
New Zealand defence ministers
New Zealand Labour Party MPs
People from Northampton
Members of the New Zealand House of Representatives
New Zealand MPs for North Island electorates
Unsuccessful candidates in the 2008 New Zealand general election
21st-century New Zealand politicians
Justice ministers of New Zealand